SNCF 232.U.1 is a French steam locomotive of the Hudson type.

It was built as part of a new locomotive program designed for the Chemins de Fer du Nord that was delayed by the outbreak of the Second World War. Its particular design distinguishes it in the small series of delivered machines, which makes it a unique model.
Delivered in 1949, it was retired from service in 1961. It has since been restored and is now preserved  at the Cité du Train in Mulhouse, where it is fired up every 20–30 minutes in a display showing how connecting rods work to propel the locomotive.

History
The locomotive was first built as part of an order with the Société Alsacienne de Constructions Mécaniques in 1935. Construction was delayed by the war and wouldn't continue until 1949 when the unit was completed by Corpet-Louvet, incorporating a number of upgrades. This particular locomotive worked the Paris-Lille mainline from 1949 to 1961.

While highly effective, the SNCF was focusing on electrification at the time; 232.U.1 would be the only example built. It worked the Paris-Lille line with seven other locomotives from the classes 232.S and 232.R. 232.U.1 would be the last mainline steam locomotive built in France.

References

Steam locomotives of France
4-6-4 locomotives
Corpet-Louvet locomotives
232.U
Railway locomotives introduced in 1949
Preserved steam locomotives
Passenger locomotives